The 1979–80 Yugoslav Ice Hockey League season was the 38th season of the Yugoslav Ice Hockey League, the top level of ice hockey in Yugoslavia. Eight teams participated in the league, and Olimpija have won the championship.

Regular season

External links
Season on hrhockey

Yugoslav
Yugoslav Ice Hockey League seasons
1979–80 in Yugoslav ice hockey